Mari (Cuneiform: , ma-riki, modern Tell Hariri) was an ancient Semitic city-state in modern-day Syria. Its remains form a tell 11 kilometers north-west of Abu Kamal on the Euphrates River western bank, some 120 kilometers southeast of Deir ez-Zor. It flourished as a trade center and hegemonic state between 2900 BC and 1759 BC. The city was built in the middle of the Euphrates trade routes between Sumer in the south and the Eblaite kingdom and the Levant in the west.

Mari was first abandoned in the middle of the 26th century BC but was rebuilt and became the capital of a hegemonic East Semitic state before 2500 BC. This second Mari engaged in a long war with its rival Ebla and is known for its strong affinity with Sumerian culture. It was destroyed in the 23rd century BC by the Akkadians, who allowed the city to be rebuilt and appointed a military governor (Shakkanakku). The governors became independent with the disintegration of the Akkadian Empire, and rebuilt the city as a regional center of the Euphrates valley. The Shakkanakkus ruled Mari until the second half of the 19th century BC, when the dynasty collapsed for unknown reasons. A short time later, Mari became the capital of the Amorite Lim dynasty. The Amorite Mari lasted only a short time before it was destroyed by Babylonia in c. 1761 BC, but it survived as a small settlement under the rule of the Babylonians and the Assyrians before being abandoned and forgotten during the Hellenistic period.

The Mariotes worshiped both Semitic and Sumerian deities and established their city as a major trading center. Although the pre-Amorite periods were characterized by heavy Sumerian cultural influence, Mari was not a city of Sumerian immigrants but a Semitic-speaking nation with a dialect similar to Eblaite. The Amorites were West Semites who began to settle the area before the 21st century BC; by the Lim dynasty (c. 1830 BC), they became the dominant population in the Fertile Crescent.

Mari's discovery in 1933 provided an important insight into the geopolitical map of ancient Mesopotamia and Syria, due to the discovery of more than 25,000 tablets explicating the state administration in the 2nd millennium BC and the nature of diplomatic relations among the political powers of the region. They also revealed the wide trading networks of the 18th century BC, which connected areas as far as Afghanistan in Southern Asia and Crete in the Mediterranean.

Name

Written in Cuneiform  (ma-riki), the name of the city can be traced to Mer, an ancient storm deity of northern Mesopotamia and Syria, who was considered the patron deity of the city, Georges Dossin noted that the name of the city was spelled identically to that of the storm god and concluded that Mari was named after him.

History

The first kingdom
It is believed that Mari did not grow from a small settlement, but was founded c. 2900 BC during the Mesopotamian Early Dynastic period I as a new city to control the waterways of the Euphrates trade routes connecting the Levant with the Sumerian south. The city was built about 1 to 2 kilometers from the Euphrates river to protect it from floods, and was connected to the river by an artificial canal 7 to 10 kilometers long whose route is hard to identify today.

The city is difficult to excavate as it is buried deep under later layers of habitation. A circular flood embankment was unearthed, containing an area 300 meters in length for gardens and craftsmen's quarters, and a defensive circular internal rampart 6.7 m thick and 8 to 10 meters high, strengthened by defensive towers. Other findings include one of the city gates, a street beginning at the center and ending at the gate, and residential houses. Mari had a central mound, but no temple or palace has been unearthed there. A large building was however excavated (with dimensions of 32 m x 25 m), seemingly with an administrative function. It had stone foundations and rooms up to 12 meters long and 6 meters wide. The city was abandoned c. 2550 BC at the end of the Early Dynastic period II, for unknown reasons.

The second kingdom

Around the beginning of Early Dynastic period III (earlier than 2500 BC) Mari was rebuilt and populated again. The new city kept many of the first city's exterior features, including the internal rampart and gate. Also kept was the outer circular embankment measuring 1.9 km in diameter, which was topped by a wall two meters thick capable of protecting archers.

However, the internal urban structure was completely changed and the new city was carefully planned. First to be built were the streets that descended from the elevated center into the gates, ensuring the drainage of rain water.

At the heart of the city, a royal palace was built that also served as a temple. Four successive architectural levels from the second kingdom's palace have been unearthed (the oldest is designated P3, while the latest is P0). The last two levels are dated to the Akkadian period. The first two levels were excavated; the findings include a temple (Enceinte Sacrée or Sacred Enclosure) dedicated to an unknown deity, a pillared throne room, and a hall with three double wood pillars leading to the temple.

Six smaller temples were discovered in the city, including the temple called the Massif Rouge (unknown dedication), and temples dedicated to Ninni-Zaza, Ishtarat, Ishtar, Ninhursag and Shamash. All the temples were located in the center of the city except for the Ishtar temple; the area between the Enceinte Sacrée and the Massif Rouge is considered to have been the administrative center of the high priest.

The second kingdom appears to have been a powerful and prosperous political center, its kings held the title of Lugal, and many are attested in the city, the most important source being the letter of king Enna-Dagan c. 2350 BC, which was sent to Irkab-Damu of Ebla,. In it, the Mariote king mentions his predecessors and their military achievements. However, the reading of this letter is still uncertain and many interpretations have been presented by scholars.

Mari–Ebla war

The earliest attested king in the letter of Enna-Dagan is Ansud, who is mentioned as attacking Ebla, the traditional rival of Mari with whom it had a long war, and conquering many of Ebla's cities, including the land of Belan. The next king mentioned in the letter is Saʿumu, who conquered the lands of Ra'ak and Nirum. King Kun-Damu of Ebla defeated Mari in the middle of the 25th century BC. The war continued with Išhtup-Išar of Mari's conquest of Emar at a time of Eblaite weakness in the mid-24th century BC. King Igrish-Halam of Ebla had to pay tribute to Iblul-Il of Mari, who is mentioned in the letter, conquering many of Ebla's cities and campaigning in the Burman region.

Enna-Dagan also received tribute; his reign fell entirely within the reign of Irkab-Damu of Ebla, who managed to defeat Mari and end the tribute. Mari defeated Ebla's ally Nagar in year seven of the Eblaite vizier Ibrium's term, causing the blockage of trade routes between Ebla and southern Mesopotamia via upper Mesopotamia. The war reached a climax when the Eblaite vizier Ibbi-Sipish made an alliance with Nagar and Kish to defeat Mari in a battle near Terqa. Ebla itself suffered its first destruction a few years after Terqa in c. 2300 BC, during the reign of the Mariote king Hidar. According to Alfonso Archi, Hidar was succeeded by Ishqi-Mari whose royal seal was discovered. It depicts battle scenes, causing Archi to suggest that he was responsible for the destruction of Ebla while still a general.

Destruction of Mari by Sargon of Akkad

Just a decade after Ebla's destruction (c. 2300 BC middle chronology), Mari itself was destroyed and burned by Sargon of Akkad, as shown by one of his year names ("Year in which Mari was destroyed"). Michael Astour proposed the date as c. 2265 BC (short chronology). Ishqi-Mari was probably the last king of Mari before the conquests by the Akkadian Empire. Sargon of Akkad collected tribute from Mari and Elam:

The third kingdom

Mari was deserted for two generations before being restored by the Akkadian king Manishtushu. A governor was appointed to govern the city who held the title Shakkanakku (military governor). Akkad kept direct control over the city, which is evident by Naram-Sin of Akkad's appointment of two of his daughters to priestly offices in the city.

The Shakkanakku dynasty

The first member of the Shakkanakku dynasty on the lists is Ididish, who was appointed in c. 2266 BC. According to the lists, Ididish ruled for 60 years and was succeeded by his son, making the position hereditary.

The third Mari followed the second city in terms of general structure, phase P0 of the old royal palace was replaced by a new palace for the Shakkanakku. Another smaller palace was built in the eastern part of the city, and contained royal burials that date to the former periods. The ramparts were rebuilt and strengthened while the embankment was turned into a defensive wall that reached 10 meters in width. The former sacred inclosure was maintained, so was the temple of Ninhursag. However, the temples of Ninni-Zaza and Ishtarat disappeared, while a new temple called the "temple of lions" (dedicated to Dagan), was built by the Shakkanakku Ishtup-Ilum and attached to it, was a rectangular terrace that measured 40 x 20 meters for sacrifices.

Akkad disintegrated during Shar-Kali-Sharri's reign, and Mari gained its independence, but the use of the Shakkanakku title continued during the following Third Dynasty of Ur period. A princess of Mari married the son of king Ur-Nammu of Ur, and Mari was nominally under Ur hegemony. However, the vassalage did not impede the independence of Mari, and some Shakkanakkus used the royal title Lugal in their votive inscriptions, while using the title of Shakkanakku in their correspondence with the Ur's court. The dynasty ended for unknown reasons not long before the establishment of the next dynasty, which took place in the second half of the 19th century BC.

The Lim dynasty
The second millennium BC in the Fertile Crescent was characterized by the expansion of the Amorites, which culminated with them dominating and ruling most of the region, including Mari which in c. 1830 BC, became the seat of the Amorite Lim dynasty under king Yaggid-Lim. However, the epigraphical and archaeological evidences showed a high degree of continuity between the Shakkanakku and the Amorite eras.

Yaggid-Lim was the ruler of Suprum before establishing himself in Mari, he entered an alliance with Ila-kabkabu of Ekallatum, but the relations between the two monarchs changed to an open war. The conflict ended with Ila-kabkabu capturing Yaggid-Lim's heir Yahdun-Lim and according to a tablet found in Mari, Yaggid-Lim who survived Ila-kabkabu was killed by his servants. However, in c. 1820 BC Yahdun-Lim was firmly in control as king of Mari.

Yahdun-Lim started his reign by subduing seven of his rebelling tribal leaders, and rebuilding the walls of Mari and Terqa in addition to building a new fort which he named Dur-Yahdun-Lim. He then expanded west and claimed to have reached the Mediterranean, however he later had to face a rebellion by the Banu-Yamina nomads who were centered at Tuttul, and the rebels were supported by Yamhad's king Sumu-Epuh, whose interests were threatened by the recently established alliance between Yahdun-Lim and Eshnunna. Yahdun-Lim defeated the Yamina but an open war with Yamhad was avoided, as the Mariote king became occupied by his rivalry with Shamshi-Adad I of Shubat-Enlil, the son of the late Ila-kabkabu. The war ended in a defeat for Mari, and Yahdun-Lim was assassinated in c. 1798 BC by his possible son Sumu-Yamam, who himself got assassinated two years after ascending the throne while Shamshi-Adad advanced and annexed Mari.

The Assyrian era and the Lim restoration
Shamshi-Adad appointed his son Yasmah-Adad on the throne of Mari, the new king married Yahdun-Lim's daughter, while the rest of the Lim family took refuge in Yamhad, and the annexation was officially justified by what Shamshi-Adad considered sinful acts on the side of the Lim family. To strengthen his position against his new enemy Yamhad, Shamshi-Adad married Yasmah-Adad to Betlum, the daughter of Ishi-Addu of Qatna. However, Yasmah-Adad neglected his bride causing a crisis with Qatna, and he proved to be an unable leader causing the rage of his father who died in c. 1776 BC, while the armies of Yarim-Lim I of Yamhad were advancing in support of Zimri-Lim, the heir of the Lim dynasty.

As Zimri-Lim advanced, a leader of the Banu-Simaal (Zimri-Lim's tribe) overthrew Yasmah-Adad, opening the road for Zimri-Lim who arrived a few months after Yasmah-Adad's escape, and married princess Shibtu the daughter of Yarim-Lim I a short time after his enthronement in c. 1776 BC. Zimri-Lim's ascension to the throne with the help of Yarim-Lim I affected Mari's status, Zimri-Lim referred to Yarim-Lim as his father, and the Yamhadite king was able to order Mari as the mediator between Yamhad's main deity Hadad and Zimri-Lim, who declared himself a servant of Hadad.

Zimri-Lim started his reign with a campaign against the Banu-Yamina, he also established alliances with Eshnunna and Hammurabi of Babylon, and sent his armies to aid the Babylonians. The new king directed his expansion policy toward the north in the Upper Khabur region, which was named Idamaraz, where he subjugated the local petty kingdoms in the region such as Urkesh, and Talhayum, forcing them into vassalage. The expansion was met by the resistance of Qarni-Lim, the king of Andarig, whom Zimri-Lim defeated, securing the Mariote control over the region in c. 1771 BC, and the kingdom prospered as a trading center and entered a period of relative peace. Zimri-Lim's greatest heritage was the renovation of the Royal Palace, which was expanded greatly to contain 275 rooms, exquisite artifacts such as The Goddess of the Vase statue, and a royal archive that contained thousands of tablets.

The relations with Babylon worsened with a dispute over the city of Hīt that consumed much time in negotiations, during which a war against Elam involved both kingdoms in c. 1765 BC. Finally, the kingdom was invaded by Hammurabi who defeated Zimri-Lim in battle in c. 1761 BC and ended the Lim dynasty, while Terqa became the capital of a rump state named the Kingdom of Hana.

Later periods

Mari survived the destruction and rebelled against Babylon in c. 1759 BC, causing Hammurabi to destroy the whole city. However, by an act of mercy Hammurabi allowed Mari to survive as a small village under Babylonian administration. Later, Mari became part of Assyria and was listed among the territories conquered by the Assyrian king Tukulti-Ninurta I (reigned 1243–1207 BC). Afterward, Mari constantly changed hands between Assyria and Babylon.

In the middle of the eleventh century BC, Mari became part of Hana whose king Tukulti-Mer took the title king of Mari and rebelled against Assyria, causing the Assyrian king Ashur-bel-kala to attack the city. Mari came firmly under the authority of the Neo-Assyrian Empire, and was assigned in the first half of the 8th century BC to a certain Nergal-Erish to govern under the authority of king Adad-Nirari III (reigned 810–783 BC). In c. 760 BC, Shamash-Risha-Usur, an autonomous governor ruling parts of the upper middle Euphrates under the nominal authority of Ashur-dan III, styled himself the governor of the lands of Suhu and Mari, so did his son Ninurta-Kudurri-Usur. However, by that time, Mari was known to be located in the so-called Land of Laqe, making it unlikely that the Usur family actually controlled it, and suggesting that the title was employed out of historical reasons. The city continued as a small settlement until the Hellenistic period before disappearing from records.

By 2015, ISIS devasted and looted systematically the site and specially the royal palace. It was one of the first archaeological sites to be occupied by this group.

People, language and government

The founders of the first city may have been Sumerians or more probably East Semitic speaking people from Terqa in the north. I. J. Gelb relates Mari's foundation with the Kish civilization, which was a cultural entity of East Semitic speaking populations, that stretched from the center of Mesopotamia to Ebla in the western Levant.

At its height, the second city was the home of about 40,000 people. This population was East-Semitic speaking one, and used a dialect much similar to the language of Ebla (the Eblaite language), while the Shakkanakku period had an East-Semitic Akkadian speaking population. West Semitic names started to be attested in Mari since the second kingdom era, and by the middle Bronze-Age, the west Semitic Amorite tribes became the majority of the pastoral groups in the middle Euphrates and Khabur valleys. Amorite names started to be observed in the city toward the end of the Shakkanakku period, even among the ruling dynasty members.

During the Lim era, the population became predominantly Amorite but also included Akkadian named people, and although the Amorite language became the dominant tongue, Akkadian remained the language of writing. The pastoral Amorites in Mari were called the Haneans, a term that indicate nomads in general, those Haneans were split into the Banu-Yamina (sons of the right) and Banu-Simaal (sons of the left), with the ruling house belonging to the Banu-Simaal branch. The kingdom was also a home to tribes of Suteans who lived in the district of Terqa.

Mari was an absolute monarchy, with the king controlling every aspect of the administration, helped by the scribes who played the role of administrators. During the Lim era, Mari was divided into four provinces in addition to the capital, the provincial seats were located at Terqa, Saggaratum, Qattunan and Tuttul. Each province had its own bureaucracy, the government supplied the villagers with ploughs and agricultural equipments, in return for a share in the harvest.

Culture and religion

The first and second kingdoms were heavily influenced by the Sumerian south. The society was led by an urban oligarchy, and the citizens were well known for elaborate hair styles and dress. The calendar was based on a solar year divided into twelve months, and was the same calendar used in Ebla "the old Eblaite calendar". Scribes wrote in Sumerian language and the art was indistinguishable from Sumerian art, so was the architectural style.

Mesopotamian influence continued to affect Mari's culture during the Amorite period, which is evident in the Babylonian scribal style used in the city. However, it was less influential than the former periods and a distinct Syrian style prevailed, which is noticeable in the seals of kings, which reflect a clear Syrian origin. The society was a tribal one, it consisted mostly of farmers and nomads (Haneans), and in contrast to Mesopotamia, the temple had a minor role in everyday life as the power was mostly invested in the palace. Women enjoyed a relative equality to men, queen Shibtu ruled in her husband's name while he was away, and had an extensive administrative role and authority over her husband's highest officials.

The Pantheon included both Sumerian and Semitic deities, and throughout most of its history, Dagan was Mari's head of the Pantheon, while Mer was the patron deity. Other deities included the Semitic deities; Ishtar the goddess of fertility, Athtar, and Shamash, the Sun god who was regarded among the city most important deities, and believed to be all-knowing and all-seeing. Sumerian deities included Ninhursag, Dumuzi, Enki, Anu, and Enlil. Prophecy had an important role for the society, temples included prophets, who gave council to the king and participated in the religious festivals.

Economy
The first Mari provided the oldest wheel workshop yet discovered in Syria, and was a center of bronze metallurgy. The city also contained districts devoted to smelting, dyeing and pottery manufacture, using charcoal brought by river boats from the upper Khabur and Euphrates area.

The second kingdom's economy was based on both agriculture and trade. It was centralized and directed through a communal organization, with grain stored in communal granaries and distributed according to social status. The organization also controlled the animal herds in the kingdom. Some groups were direct beneficiaries of the palace instead of the communal organization, including the metal and textile producers and military officials. Ebla was an important trading partner and rival, Mari's position made it an important trading center astride the road linking the Levant and Mesopotamia.

The Amorite Mari maintained the older aspects of the economy, still largely based on irrigated agriculture along the Euphrates valley. The city remained a trading center for merchants from Babylonia and other kingdoms, with goods from the south and east transported on riverboats bound for the north, northwest and west. The main trade was metals and tin from the Iranian Plateau exported west as far as Crete. Other goods included copper from Cyprus, silver from Anatolia, wood from Lebanon, gold from Egypt, olive oil, wine, and textiles, and even precious stones from modern Afghanistan.

Excavations and archive

Mari was discovered in 1933, on the eastern flank of Syria, near the Iraqi border. A Bedouin tribe was digging through a mound called Tell Hariri for a gravestone that would be used for a recently deceased tribesman, when they came across a headless statue. After the news reached the French authorities currently in control of Syria, the report was investigated, and digging on the site was started on December 14, 1933 by archaeologists from the Louvre in Paris. The location of the fragment was excavated, revealing the temple of Ishtar, which led to the commencing of the full scale excavations. Mari was classified by the archaeologists as the "most westerly outpost of Sumerian culture".

Since the beginning of excavations, over 25,000 clay tablets in Akkadian language written in cuneiform were discovered. Finds from the excavation are on display in the Louvre, the National Museum of Aleppo, the National Museum of Damascus, and the Deir ez-Zor Museum. In the latter, the southern façade of the Court of the Palms room from Zimri-Lim's palace has been reconstructed, including the wall paintings.

Mari has been excavated in annual campaigns in 1933–1939, 1951–1956, and since 1960. André Parrot conducted the first 21 seasons up to 1974, and was followed by Jean-Claude Margueron (1979–2004), and Pascal Butterlin (starting in 2005). A journal devoted to the site, released in 8 volumes between 1982 and 1997, was Mari: Annales de recherches interdisciplinaires. Archaeologists have tried to determine how many layers the site descends, according to French archaeologist André Parrot, "each time a vertical probe was commenced in order to trace the site's history down to virgin soil, such important discoveries were made that horizontal digging had to be resumed."

Mari tablets
Over 25,000 tablets were found in the burnt library of Zimri-Lim written in Akkadian from a period of 50 years between circa 1800 – 1750 BC. They give information about the kingdom, its customs, and the names of people who lived during that time. More than 3000 are letters, the remainder includes administrative, economic, and judicial texts. Almost all the tablets found were dated to the last 50 years of Mari's independence, and most have now been published. The language of the texts is official Akkadian, but proper names and hints in syntax show that the common language of Mari's inhabitants was Northwest Semitic. Six of the tablets found were in the Hurrian language.

Current situation
Excavations stopped from 2011 as a result of the Syrian Civil War and have not restarted. The site came under the control of armed gangs and suffered large scale looting. A 2014 official report revealed that robbers were focusing on the royal palace, the public baths, the temple of Ishtar and the temple of Dagan. Based on satelite imagery, looting continued until at least 2017.

See also

 Tourism in Syria
 Cities of the Ancient Near East
 Short chronology timeline
 Statue of Iddi-Ilum
 Ornina

Notes

References

Citations

Sources

External links

 Mari Mari passage on the Syrian ministry of culture website (in Arabic).
 Syrie - Mari Mari page on Britannica.
 Mari (Tell Hariri) Suggestion to have Mari (Tell Hariri) recognized as a UNESCO world heritage site, in 1999

 
States and territories established in the 3rd millennium BC
States and territories disestablished in the 18th century BC
Amorite cities
Former populated places in Syria
Archaeological sites in Deir ez-Zor Governorate
Bronze Age sites in Syria
Tells (archaeology)
Populated places established in the 3rd millennium BC
29th-century BC establishments
Kish civilization
Early Dynastic Period (Mesopotamia)
Former kingdoms
City-states